Jamia Masjid is a mosque in Srinagar, Jammu and Kashmir, India. Situated at Nowhatta in the middle of the Old City, the Mosque was commissioned by Sultan Sikandar in 1394 CE and completed in 1402 CE, at the behest of Mir Mohammad Hamadani, son of Mir Sayyid Ali Hamadani, and is regarded as one of the most important mosques in Kashmir. The Mosque is located in Downtown which remains a  central zone to the religio-political life in Srinagar. Thronged by Muslims every Friday, it is one of the prime  tourist attractions of Srinagar.

Architecture 

The Jamia Masjid is heavily influenced by Persian architecture, with similarities to the Buddhist pagodas. The structure occupies a total area of 384 x 381 feet and is quadrangular in shape with four turrets. These are in the middle of each side and covered with pyramidal roofs. All of the turrets are interconnected by spacious halls, with bright yellow poppies lining the mossy brick paths and the entire structure is surrounded by wide lanes on all four sides and has a square garden in the middle. The entrance on the southern side of the Mosque comprises a recessed portico which further leads onto an inner courtyard. This courtyard is based on the traditional Chaar Bagh plan and has a tank in the centre. The entire courtyard is made up of pointed arched, brick arcade. The court which was originally planted with a series of chinars is enclosed by arched liwans (cloisters) covered with two tiered sloping roof.

In History

Sikh Era (1819-1846 CE)
For 21 years, the Mosque faced closure under the Sikh regime of Maharaja Ranjit Singh beginning in 1819 AD, when the-then Governor of Srinagar, Moti Ram, put curbs on offering prayers in Jamia Masjid. No prayers were offered and no call for prayers was given from the Mosque. It was reopened by Governor, Ghulam Muhi-ud-Din, in 1843 who spent nearly a lakh and a half of rupees on its repair. But for 11 years, rulers allowed prayers only on Fridays. The Mosque would be opened for just few hours on Fridays and closed again.

July 13, 1931

The martyrs of July 13, 1931 were taken to Jamia Masjid after the police opened fire and 22 people were killed and hundreds injured. The bodies of the martyrs were laid in the shrine compound of Khawaja Naqashband Sahab Khawaja Bazar Srinagar where Sheikh Abdullah, Mirwaiz Maulvi Muhammad Yusuf Shah and other leaders started delivering speeches against Maharaja Hari Singh.

Post 1947
According to historian Mohammad Ishaq Khan, “Jamia Masjid has primarily played a significant part in imparting religious education. However, with the spread of modern education among Kashmiri Muslims, thanks to the efforts of Mirwaiz Ghulam Rasul Shah, the Masjid began to play a seminal role in the growth of political consciousness. Sheikh Muhammad Abdullah was, in fact, initiated into what I would call the mysteries of Kashmiri Muslim politics at Jamia Masjid by Mirwaiz Muhammad Yusuf Shah.”

The Jamia Masjid has been a hot-bed of raging political discourse on the present turmoil in the state, and the politics that has unfolded in Kashmir has led to curbs and gags on congregations here. The Mosque has also become a platform for people to debate and discuss the politics of the Kashmir conflict.
Prolonged closure of the Mosque came into effect in 2008 when the Amarnath land row erupted. The decision of the state government to prevent people from offering Friday prayers for weeks led to massive outrage, and was seen as an attempt to choke the rebellion whose epicentre was the areas of the old city, particularly around Jamia Masjid.
During the Mehbooba Mufti led coalition government, the Mosque was again locked down for three months during the unrest of 2016, and again in 2017 and 2018 for different periods of time.

After the revocation of the erstwhile state's speci status—and its bifurcation into two—on 5 August 2019, the government imposed restrictions on prayers for 136 days.

The Complex

The inner courtyard measures  x  having a  x  water tank with a fountain flowing in the centre. The lower portion of the walls is made of rectangular stones. There are three big entrance gates on north, south and eastern sides of the Mosque confronting three turrets standing on lofty columns of deodar wood. The eastern side has a large entrance called the Shah Gate which is covered with a pyramidal roof surmounted by a square open pavilion with a spire on top. A total of 378 wooden columns support the roof. The mihrab too has a similar turret over it. Initially the roof was covered with birch bark and clay.
The western wall of the cloister has a mihrab made of black Kashmiri marble which is adorned with beautiful calligraphic work and has engraved on it ninety-nine attributes of Almighty Allah.
The Mosque can hold 33,333 persons besides the Imam at a single prayer congregation.

To reach the Mosque roof, the walls of the four turrets have interior stairs in the circular form that end in the lounges of each turret. The city of Srinagar can be viewed from these high turrets. The roof is constructed out of timber and iron bars. The birch bark over the roof is now replaced by corrugated iron sheets. 
The inner courtyard of the Mosque has a water fountain, that is used for ablution, with four lawns around it decorated with chinar trees. The water tank in the courtyard was originally fed by a water channel known as Lachma Kual.

Reconstructions 

The Mosque has been subject to much destruction till date due to the damage caused by fires. The Mosque was partially or completely destroyed by devastating fires thrice but was restored after every disaster. The existing construction was erected by Mughal emperor Aurangzeb in 1672 C.E. The reconstructions and major renovations in mosque's history have been conducted by:
 Sultan Sikandar (r. 1389–1413 CE) in 1394 CE (796 AH): The Sultan commissioned the construction of the Mosque in 1394 CE and it was completed in 1402 CE.
 Sultan Hasan Shah (r. 1472–1484 CE) in 1480 CE (885 AH): The first fire that damaged it was in 1479, and the then ruler, Sultan Hasan Shah, immediately began the reconstruction work. He died before the repair work was done, and the task was taken over by Ibrahim Magre, the Commander-in-Chief of Kashmir forces under the rule of Muhammad Shah and Fateh Shah and completed it by 1503 CE.
 Jehangir (r. 1605–1627 CE) in 1620 CE (1083 AH): After facing another fatal destruction because of fire during the supremacy of Mughal Emperor Jehangir, the Mosque was re-constructed under an architect-historian  based in Kashmir, namely, Malik Haider of Tsodur. The entire repair work took 17 years to complete.
 Aurangzeb (r. 1658–1707 CE) in 1672 CE: The third fire that distorted the structure was during the reign of Aurangzeb. It is said that when Aurangzeb heard about the accident, he only inquired if the chinars were safe, for 'the Mosque could be rebuilt in a short time. A full-grown chinar can never be replaced.' He got together all the bricklayers and masons of the city, and Jamia Masjid was restored within three years.

Pertinently, during his reign, Sultan Zain-ul-Abidin (r. 1420–1470 CE) extended the Mosque and constructed a turret in the primary structure. The last restoration work was carried out under the reign of Maharaja Pratap Singh (r. 1885-1925 CE). Singh enthusiastically encouraged the reconstruction of the Mosque many times and even offered financial assistance. However, all the renovations were carried out to reflect the original architecture and to retain the historic value of the Mosque that it has carried through centuries.

Maintenance

The Jamia Masjid falls under the domain of Anjuman-e-Auqaf, a private enterprise. The caretaker board of the Mosque was constituted in 1975. Major source of revenue comes from the rent of 278  shops (owned by the Auqaf) around the Mosque and other sources of public funding. The revenue is not fixed and varies annually. Before the inception of the Auqaf, income for the Mosque used to come from elite citizens of the State.
For the welfare of the Mosque, INTACH has recently taken over the reins of renovation.

Desecration
On December 28, 2018, a group of masked young men stormed into the Mosque with ISIS flags after Friday congregational prayers, when the Mosque was nearly empty, and a video of the incident went viral on social media. The incident became highly publicised and provoked condemnation from a wide range of organisations and public figures, including the mosque's mirwaiz and the chief minister of the state.
 A day to "purify" the mosque, and another to reiterate its importance and sanctity, were observed the following week.

Restrictions 
The mosque is often put under lockdown by the Indian administration.

See also 
 List of largest mosques
 Khanqah-e-Moula
 Soura
 Hazratbal Shrine

References

Buildings and structures in Srinagar
Srinagar Jamia Masjid
Religious buildings and structures completed in 1400
Srinagar
14th-century mosques